Buolick  can refer to either:

Buolick, a civil parish and electoral division in County Tipperary 
Buolick (townland), a small townland in Buolick civil parish